Intimissimi is an Italian clothing label founded in 1996, which  specializes in bras, briefs, lingerie, vests, and pyjamas for women and men.

Intimissimi clothing was sold through Victoria's Secret's in a third-party partnership arrangement.  In 2007, this partnership was expanded to sell Intimissimi in 240 Victoria's Secret stores.

In 2015 the model Shlomit Malka became the face of Intimissimi. She led the company's international advertising campaigns until she was replaced in 2017 by Dakota Johnson.

In October 2017, the brand launched its fourth edition of Intimissimi on ice in the Verona Arena, with costumes designed by Chiara Ferragni. Intimissimi was one brand she used as a "symbolic vocabulary". In October 2017, Intimissimi opened a 500-square-foot store on New York's Fifth Avenue.

For the 2017 campaign Mario Testino photographed Serbian ex-sportswoman Ana Ivanovic, food writer Ella Mills, model Irina Shayk, and actress Dakota Johnson.

In June 2020, Intimissimi launched the Infinity shelf service, a system which removes the risk of out-of-stock by drawing from the e-commerce window.

See also

 List of Italian companies

References

External links 

 

Italian companies established in 1996
Clothing brands of Italy
Clothing retailers of Italy
Companies based in Veneto
Clothing companies established in 1996
Lingerie brands
Underwear brands
Fashion accessory brands
Swimwear manufacturers